Lil Pump 2 is the third studio album by American rapper Lil Pump. It was released independently on March 17, 2023, and the sequel to his self-titled debut album that was released in 2017 to favourable reviews. Work on the album commended in mid 2019 and concluded in 2023. The album consists of 16 tracks and features guest appearances from Smokepurpp, YoungBoy Never Broke Again, Ty Dolla Sign, among others. The album was executive produced by CBMix. Production was also handled by Bighead, Carnage, Ronny J, among others. It was supported by five singles – "All the Sudden", "Splurgin", "Mosh Pit", "She Know", and "Tesla". It follows his sophomore studio album Harverd Dropout (2019).

Lil Pump 2 received mostly positive reviews from music critics.

Background

Lil Pump released his eponymous studio album in October 2017, which marked his official transition from being a SoundCloud rapper to being in the mainstream eye. Its sequel was announced in 2019 but was delayed in favor of a collaborative album with Ronny J titled No Name, which was silently released on December 10, 2021. It was later announced that the project was slated for release in August 2022, but was delayed because Garcia claimed to have lost the hard drive containing the album in a lake.

Pump first announced the album on May 27, 2019. Since announcing Lil Pump 2 in 2019, Lil Pump often teased new projects that have since been scrapped such as Pump Rock and Red Ain't Dead, but in 2022, he confirmed that Lil Pump 2 was his next project. A slew of singles were released during the span of 2020 and 2022 to help tease the album, but none of the singles ended up making it on the album.

After keeping quiet about the album's existence, in June 2022, Lil Pump took to a now-deleted Instagram post in which he called the album a masterpiece:Lil Pump 2 is a masterpiece I can't wait for you guys to hear it.In August 2022, during an interview with Inked Magazine, Lil Pump originally confirmed that it would be dropping that same month, however, that ended up not being the case:Yessirski! It's dropping in August around my birthday. It's about to be crazy. This is gonna be a masterpiece.That same month, an early tracklist surfaced online, consisting of twenty-two tracks, with a wide variety of features in which the majority but a few features and songs teased were cut from the final tracklist. On March 10, 2023, Lil Pump took to Instagram to reveal the album's cover art and tracklist, with features ranging from YoungBoy Never Broke Again, Rio Da Yung OG, the previously mentioned Smokepurpp, Ty Dolla Sign, and G4 Boyz.

Singles and promotion 
Pump released the album's lead single, "All the Sudden", on April 12, 2022. It was followed by the second single, "Splurgin", which was released on July 20, 2022. The third single, "Mosh Pit", was released on September 27, 2022. "She Know" featuring Ty Dolla Sign was released as the fourth on December 16, 2020. "Tesla" with Smokepurpp was released as fifth and final single for the album, being released February 24, 2023. Pump also smashed a brand new Ferrari windshield to promote the project.

Artwork 
On March 11, 2023, Pump announced the cover art for Lil Pump 2 via social media. Cover potrays more of a rock/punk theme to it. Cover shows Pump shaking his head, which his hair spells "LP2".

Critical reception

Reviewing the album for Clash, Robin Murray stated "‘Lil Pump 2’ is all glitz and fireworks, while never truly leading from the front. Tapping back into his core values, it’s a fan pleaser, but ultimately finds Lil Pump staying still." 

Sabrina Morris from HotNewHipHop gave the album a "HOTTTTT" rating, equal to a 4/5. She praised the album for being "similar to his previous work as most of the songs have a catchy hook, a heavy, hard-hitting baseline, and strong 808s".

Track listing

References 

Lil Pump albums
2023 albums
Albums produced by Ronny J